Twin XL is an American synthpop band that originated in Los Angeles, California. Formed in 2017, the original members of the band consists of lead vocalist and guitarist Cameron Walker-Wright, guitarist John Gomez and bassist Stephen Gomez. The band is joined by drummer Brennan Benko who originally was a touring member until being an official member of the group in 2021. As of 2019, their music has garnered over 3 million streams.

History
Twin XL originally formed in 2017 by Cameron Walker, who was apart of synth-pop band Nekokat and brothers John and Stephen Gomez who are also apart of pop rock band The Summer Set. The group met over a decade ago playing in different bands and in early 2017, they met at a LA house party and decided to try a day in the studio together thus forming the band. According to singer Cameron Walker, guitarist John Gomez had thought of the name Twin XL. Throughout their time as a group, they have opened for bands such as, iDKHOW and The Maine.

The group released their debut single "Good" in October 2018. It is the bands first song to hit the charts peaking at number 24 on the Billboard Alternative Airplay chart and number 43 on the Rock & Alternative Airplay chart. Their debut EP How to Talk to Strangers was released on March 1, 2019. Two other singles were released from the EP: "Sunglasses" and "Friends". In support of the EP, the group joined Jukebox the Ghost and the Mowgli's on a spring tour in 2019.

The group joined Fitz and the Tantrums on the "All the Feels Tour" in early 2020. After the release of their EP, they have released multiple singles and collaborated with artists such as, American Teeth and Little Hurt. Brennan Benko started off as a session and touring drummer for the band until it was later revealed on Twitter that he officially joined the group in 2021. In 2021, they released their second EP Slow Heart (Reimagined) which included the single "Slow Heart". Additionally, the group also released an online video game for the song. The groups latest singles to-date are "Upgrade" featuring American pop rock band Dreamers and "Seasonal Depression".

Their music has been featured in commercials and trailers for networks such as Disney and ABC.

Musical style and influences
The group cites inspiration from bands such as, Foster the People, Chvrches, MGMT and The Cure. Walker-Wright stated that those bands influenced their synth and poppy sound. The group also stated that they write and produce the music themselves. Their musical style has been described as, alternative pop, indie pop, synthpop, and rock.

Band members
Current members
 Cameron Walker – lead vocals, guitar 
 John Gomez – guitar, backing vocals 
 Stephen Gomez – bass, synthesizers 
 Brennan Benko – drums, percussion 

Former touring members
 Dave Briggs – drums, percussion 
 Kyle Rodgers – drums, percussion

Discography

Extended Plays

Singles

As featured artists

Promotional singles

Tours

Opening act
 Spring Tour  (2019)
 Night Heat Tour  (2019)
 The Mirror Tour  (2019)
 All The Feels Tour  (2020)

References

Synthpop groups
American synth-pop groups